Rocklin High School is a public high school in Rocklin, California a northeastern suburb located near Sacramento, California. It is one of three high schools in Rocklin Unified School District.

Courses

Visual and performing arts

Instrumental music
As of 2018, the following music courses are offered and taught by Tom Douglass
 Concert Band
 Symphonic Band
 Wind Ensemble
 String Orchestra
 Guitar Lab
 Piano Lab
 Jazz Band
 AP Music Theory

Both Band and Orchestra have gone on trips to Hawaii and Southern California and performed at various Jazz Festivals and Band Festivals and have won countless awards.

Choir

 Concert Choir (Non-Auditioned SSAA Ensemble open to any Female student at RHS)
 Advanced Women's Ensemble (Auditioned Ensemble open to any female student at RHS)
 Chamber Choir (Auditioned SATB Choral Ensemble)
 Men's Chorale (Non-Auditioned Ensemble open to any RHS male singer) Returning to RHS 2014/15 School Year
 Thunder Choir (Combined Choirs performing at concerts and festivals)

RHS Directors of a Vocal and Choral Activities
David Dick (1993–1997)
Ken Harned (1997–1998)
Maryann Spiess (1998–2000)
Shawn Spiess (2000–2004)
Meredith Hawkins (2004–2013)
Shawn Spiess (2013–Present)
Participation in the two advanced choirs, Advanced Women's Ensemble and Chamber Choir, is by audition only. RHS choirs perform in various school and community events, and have achieved both gold and silver levels at Heritage Music Festivals. In 2004 RHS Gone Choir was one of seven choirs chosen from around the nation to perform as the National Youth Choir at Carnegie Hall in New York City under the direction of renowned choral conductor Paul Salamunovich. In addition, RHS Honor Choir was one of the two top choirs chosen to perform on its own. In 2010, RHS Chamber Choir took home gold recognition and placed third overall at Heritage Music Festivals. The Advanced Women's Ensemble also received gold recognition and placed first in their category.  The choirs at RHS have also had opportunities to perform in Hawaii, San Francisco, Los Angeles, as well as performing with the Vancouver Philharmonic Orchestra in Vancouver, Canada in 2002.

Theatre
Rocklin High School offers four theatre classes: Theatre I is an introductory theatre course. Theatre II/III is an intermediate, two-year course with a curriculum that alternates every other year. Theatre IV is the advanced theatre class. Technical theatre focuses on the "behind-the-scenes" aspect of theatre, including set building. Traditionally, three theatrical productions are performed each year: the Fall Play, the Winter Musical, and the Spring Comedy. The Theatre IV class participates in the Lenaea Festival at California State University, Sacramento. Cindy Toepke has taught the classes since the school first opened.

Dance
Four levels of Dance classes are offered, and a course in partner (ballroom) dancing. There is a performing Dance Team (previously called "Rhythm in Blue").

Other achievements 

Rocklin High has an award-winning engineering program. Students used to compete annually in the SkillsUSA competitions, and have earned gold medals at the Regional, State, and National levels.

The 2005–2006 Rocklin High Yearbook placed first in the 2006 NSPA Nashville Convention Best-In-Show for the 325+ page category.

It 2007, Rocklin's theatre four class won eight separate awards at the Lenaea Festival held at California State University, Sacramento.

Administration
Rocklin High School has had five principals since it was established in 1993:
 Phil Spears 1993–2000
 Debra Hawkins 2000–2005
 Michael Garrison 2005–2011
 David Bills 2011–2015
 Davis Stewart 2015-

David Bills stepped down as principal, and was replaced by an interim principal in January 2015. Davis Stewart took over as principal in the 2015–2016 school year.

Notable alumni
Alexandra Tyler - Miss April 2015 Playboy Playmate
Chase Baker- NFL player
Logan Webb - MLB pitcher for the San Francisco Giants
Nick Mears- MLB Pitcher for the Pittsburgh Pirates

References

External links
Rocklin High School website

High schools in Placer County, California
Educational institutions established in 1993
Public high schools in California
1993 establishments in California